Interstate 77 (I-77) is a north–south Interstate Highway in the eastern United States. It traverses diverse terrain, from the mountainous state of West Virginia to the rolling farmlands of North Carolina and Ohio. It largely supplants the old US Route 21 (US 21) between Cleveland, Ohio, and Columbia, South Carolina, as an important north–south corridor through the middle Appalachians. The southern terminus of I-77 is in Cayce, South Carolina, in Lexington County at the junction with I-26. The northern terminus is in Cleveland at the junction with I-90. Other major cities that I-77 connects to include Columbia, South Carolina; Charlotte, North Carolina; Charleston, West Virginia; and Akron, Ohio. The East River Mountain Tunnel, connecting Virginia and West Virginia, is one of only two instances in the United States where a mountain road tunnel crosses a state line. The other is the Cumberland Gap Tunnel, connecting Tennessee and Kentucky. I-77 is a snowbird route to the Southern United States for those traveling from the Great Lakes region.

Route description 

|-
|SC
|
|-
|NC
|
|-
||VA
|
|-
|WV
|
|-
|OH
|
|-
|Total
|
|}

South Carolina 

I-77 begins as an eight-lane highway at I-26 in the far southeastern part of the Columbia metropolitan area. In the Columbia area, I-77 offers access to Fort Jackson before meeting I-20 in the northeastern part of the city. This segment of I-77, combined with I-20 and I-26, form a beltway around Columbia, though it is not officially designated as such.

After leaving the northern Columbia suburb of Blythewood, I-77 narrows to four lanes until it widens to eight lanes at Rock Hill from exit 77 to the North Carolina state line at I-485.

The final section of the entire length of I-77 was completed in Columbia in 1995.

North Carolina 

I-77 through North Carolina begins at the South Carolina state line at Pineville. It narrows to six lanes on the North Carolina side south of Charlotte and then widens to 8 and 10 lanes through downtown before entering the North Carolina Piedmont region. In Charlotte, it intersects I-85 as well as intersecting each of the loops of I-485 and I-277 (twice). North of Charlotte, it skirts Lake Norman where it narrows again to four lanes before passing through Huntersville, Cornelius, Davidson, and Mooresville. Next, it crosses over US 421 in Yadkin County and continues on through Elkin. The final intersection in the state is with a discontinuous section of I-74 near Mount Airy.

I-77 in Charlotte is also known as the Bill Lee Freeway; this designation stretches from exit 6 (South Tryon Street/Woodlawn Road) in Charlotte to exit 33 (US 21 north), near Mooresville. A  portion south of the city is called the General Younts Expressway. When I-77 crosses over I-85 (which runs in an east–west direction through the interchange), the northbound lanes are to the west of the southbound lanes.

North Carolina completed its section of I-77 in 1975.

Virginia 

I-77 through Virginia passes through two tunnels: the Big Walker Mountain Tunnel and the East River Mountain Tunnel. For , I-77 and I-81 overlap near Wytheville. This is a wrong-way concurrency, where two roads run concurrent with each other but are designated in opposite directions.

On March 31, 2013, there was a nearly 100-car pileup on I-77 near Fancy Gap; as a result of that crash, electronic variable speed limit signs are now in place along that stretch of I-77. The speed limit can be adjusted according to driving conditions at a given time.

West Virginia 

I-77 enters West Virginia through the East River Mountain Tunnel. At milepost 9, I-77 becomes cosigned with the West Virginia Turnpike for the next , a toll road between Princeton and Charleston. It is concurrent with I-64 to Charleston at Beckley.

It enters Charleston via the Yeager Bridge before splitting off at a four-level junction with I-64.  north of the city center, it junctions with I-79, before proceeding north to Ripley and Parkersburg.

North of Charleston, I-77 is known as the Korean War Veterans Memorial Highway.

Ohio 

Entering from West Virginia at Marietta, I-77 passes through rolling Appalachian terrain.

I-77 continues north through Canton and then Akron, where it connects with I-76. The interchange with I-80, the Ohio Turnpike, between Akron and Cleveland was completed in December 2001; previously, traffic had to exit at State Route 21 (SR 21) to access the Turnpike. I-77 ends at I-90 in Cleveland.

I-77 is also known as the Vietnam Veterans Memorial Highway in Ohio and the Willow Freeway in Greater Cleveland.

Junction list 
South Carolina
  in Cayce
  in Cayce
  in Columbia
  on the Woodfield–Dentsville CDP line
  in Dentsville
  south of Blythewood
  on the Lesslie–Rock Hill line
  in Rock Hill
  north of Fort Mill. The highways travel concurrently to Charlotte, North Carolina.
North Carolina
  in Charlotte
  in Charlotte
  in Charlotte
  in Charlotte
  in Charlotte
  in Huntersville
  in Cornelius. The highways travel concurrently to Mooresville.
  southeast of Troutman
  in Statesville
  in Statesville
  north of Statesville
  west-northwest of Hamptonville
  south-southeast of Jonesville. The highways travel concurrently to Elkin.
  west-southwest of Pine Ridge. The highways travel concurrently to the Virginia state line north-northwest of Pine Ridge.
Virginia
  in Woodlawn
  in Fort Chiswell. The highways travel concurrently to Wytheville.
  in Fort Chiswell. The highways travel concurrently to Wytheville.
  west of Bland
  in Rocky Gap
  north-northwest of Rocky Gap. The highways travel concurrently to Bluefield, West Virginia.
West Virginia
  east-southeast of Princeton
  south-southeast of Camp Creek
  southeast of Crab Orchard. The highways travel concurrently to Charleston.
  southeast of Snow Hill. The highways travel concurrently to Charleston.
  northeast of Charleston
  in Ripley. The highways travel concurrently to Silverton.
  east of Parkersburg
Ohio
  in Marietta
  south-southeast of Cambridge
  east of Cambridge
  northeast of Cambridge
  in Newcomerstown
  in New Philadelphia. The highways travel concurrently to south-southeast of Strasburg.
  in Canton. I-77/US 62 travels concurrently through Canton.
  south of Akron
  in Akron. I-76 and I-77 travel concurrently through Akron.
  West of Akron
  in Richfield
  on the Richfield–Brecksville line
  on the Independence–Brooklyn Heights line
  in Cleveland
  in Cleveland
  in Cleveland

Auxiliary routes 
I-277 – Charlotte
I-277 – Akron

References

External links 

 
77